Hålisen Glacier is a cirque glacier between Halisstonga Peak and Halisrimen Peak in the Kurze Mountains of Queen Maud Land, Antarctica. It was mapped by Norwegian cartographers from surveys and air photos by the Sixth Norwegian Antarctic Expedition (1956–1960) and named Hålisen (the slippery ice).

See also
 List of glaciers in the Antarctic
 Glaciology

References

Glaciers of Queen Maud Land
Princess Astrid Coast